Justin Carl Crawford (born January 13, 2004) is an American professional baseball outfielder in the Philadelphia Phillies organization.

Amateur career
Crawford spent his freshman year of high school at Rolling Hills Preparatory School in Torrance, California before transferring to Bishop Gorman High School in Las Vegas, Nevada, as a sophomore. As a junior in 2021, he batted .525. In 2022, as a senior, he batted .503 with five home runs, 52 RBIs, and twenty stolen bases. The Las Vegas Sun named him their Male Athlete of the Year. He ended the season as a top prospect for the upcoming draft. Crawford committed to play college baseball at the University of Arizona, but switched his commitment to Louisiana State University.

Professional career
The Philadelphia Phillies selected Crawford in the first round with the 17th overall selection of the 2022 Major League Baseball draft. He signed with the team for $3.89 million.

Personal life
Crawford's father, Carl Crawford, played 14 seasons of Major League Baseball. His second cousin, J. P. Crawford, currently plays for the Seattle Mariners.

References

External links

2004 births
Living people
Baseball players from Nevada
Baseball outfielders
Bishop Gorman High School alumni
African-American baseball players
21st-century African-American sportspeople